The 1911 Kentucky State College Wildcats football team represented Kentucky State College—now known as the University of Kentucky—as a member of the Southern Intercollegiate Athletic Association (SIAA) during the 1911 college football season. Led by Prentiss Douglass in his first and only season as head coach, the Wildcats compiled an overall record of 7–3 with a mark of 2–1 in SIAA play. The Kentucky Intercollegiate Athletic Association suspended Kentucky State.

Schedule

References

Kentucky State College
Kentucky Wildcats football seasons
Kentucky State College Wildcats football